The Ottoman Public Debt Administration (OPDA) (or simply  as it was popularly known), was a European-controlled organization that was established in 1881 to collect the payments which the Ottoman Empire owed to European companies in the Ottoman public debt. The OPDA became a vast, essentially independent bureaucracy within the Ottoman bureaucracy, run by the creditors and its governing council was packed with European government officials - including one representative each from British, French, German, Austrian, Italian, Dutch, and Ottoman creditors, and one representative from the Ottoman state. It employed 5,000 officials who collected taxes that were then turned over to the European creditors. At its peak it had 9,000 employees, more than the empire’s finance ministry.

The OPDA played an important role in Ottoman financial affairs. Also, it was an intermediary with European companies seeking investment opportunities in the Ottoman Empire. In 1900, the OPDA was financing many railways and other industrial projects. The financial and commercial privileges of the non-Muslim foreigners were protected with the capitulations of the Ottoman Empire.

After the dissolution of the Ottoman Empire, between 1918 and 1924 Ottoman revenue stamps overprinted O.P.D.A. or A.D.P.O., or stamps printed with those inscriptions, were issued for use in Palestine, Transjordan, Syria and Lebanon.

The OPDA was established by treaty which outlined its powers. The Ottomans agreed to turn over to the OPDA a wide swath of its income sources. The OPDA was provided the State monopolies on salt and tobacco. It was afforded the taxes on stamps, alcohol, fishing, and silk. Though those taxes were afforded only in certain regions, they included the all important Istanbul region. Non-region specific taxes were also provided, notably on shops and stores, and customs duties. Should those sources of income prove insufficient, the OPDA was also empowered to a share of foreign indemnities paid to the Ottomans by various Baltic States as a result of the Treaty of Berlin. The indemnities were of little comfort to the Ottomans anyway, because the treaty had also greatly reduced the size and population of the Empire, and thus its tax base.

Uncertainties in accounting, as well as a knowledge gap between the OPDA and the Ottomans, meant that the precise value of the Ottoman Debt was hard to ascertain. The calculation difficulties led to the advancement of statistics and accounting practices. Because the British public was particularly angered by the default and lobbied for the creation of the OPDA, combined with the accounting difficulties, British bondholders may have been overrepresented in the OPDA's repayment scheme.

See also
 Chinese Maritime Customs Service
 Caisse de la Dette in Egypt 
 International Financial Control of the Kingdom of Greece
 Moroccan Debt Administration

References

Further reading
 Birdal, Murat. "The Political Economy of Ottoman Public Debt: Insolvency and European Financial Control in the late Nineteenth Century." 2010.
 Blaisdell D., "European Financial Control in the Ottoman Empire", 1929
 Conte G., Sabatini G., "The Ottoman External Debt and Its Features Under European Financial Control (1881-1914)", «The Journal of European Economic History», 3 (2014).

External links
 

Public debt
1881 establishments in the Ottoman Empire
Organizations based in Istanbul
Defunct organizations based in Turkey
Organizations established in 1881
History of government debt